Lieutenant-Colonel Harry Norton Schofield, VC (29 January 1865 – 10 October 1931) was an English British Army officer and recipient of the Victoria Cross, the highest and most prestigious award for gallantry in the face of the enemy that can be awarded to British and Commonwealth forces.

Military career
Schofield was commissioned a lieutenant in the Royal Artillery on 15 February 1884, and promoted to captain on 1 February 1893. Following the outbreak of the Second Boer War he was posted to South Africa.

Details
Schofield was 34 years old, and a captain in the Royal Field Artillery during the Second Boer War when the following deed took place for which he was awarded the VC. On 15 December 1899, at the Battle of Colenso, South Africa, Captain Schofield with several others tried to save the guns of the 14th and 66th Batteries, Royal Field Artillery, when the detachments serving the guns had all become casualties or been driven from their guns by infantry fire at close range. Captain Schofield went out with two other officers (Walter Congreve and Frederick Roberts) and a corporal (George Nurse) when the first attempt was made to extricate the guns and helped in withdrawing the two that were saved. Schofield was initially awarded the Distinguished Service Order, but this was cancelled when he was subsequently upgraded to the VC, his citation reads:

Schofield received the medal from King Edward VII during an investiture at St. James's Palace on 29 October 1901.

He was promoted to major on 13 February 1900, and appointed Aide-de-camp to Sir Redvers Buller, General Officer Commanding the Aldershot district.

Further information

Schofield served in the First World War and retired with the rank of lieutenant colonel. He is buried in Putney Vale Cemetery.

References

Monuments to Courage (David Harvey, 1999)
The Register of the Victoria Cross (This England, 1997)
Victoria Crosses of the Anglo-Boer War (Ian Uys, 2000)

External links
Location of grave and VC medal (S.W. London)
Blue Plaque details
Angloboerwar.com

1865 births
1931 deaths
Second Boer War recipients of the Victoria Cross
British recipients of the Victoria Cross
Royal Artillery officers
Burials at Putney Vale Cemetery
Graduates of the Royal Military Academy, Woolwich
British Army personnel of the Second Boer War
British Army personnel of World War I
People from Audenshaw
Honourable Corps of Gentlemen at Arms
British Army recipients of the Victoria Cross
Military personnel from Manchester